"De aquí no sales" (stylized in all caps; also known by its full title "De aquí no sales – Cap 4: Disputa") is a Spanish-language song by Spanish singer and songwriter Rosalía. The song was released on 22 January 2019 through Columbia Records as the fifth and last single from her second studio album El mal querer (2018). The track was produced by El Guincho and co-produced by Rosalía herself. The song peaked at number 22 on the Spanish Singles Chart.

Song Contents 
The short song (2:24) is about a fight between a couple in a toxic relationship. The described physical violence refers to the album title, which loosely translates into 'Bad Love'. The clear numbering of songs might hint to the fact that the described violence in this song (nr. 4) is the result of the described jealousy in the previous song nr 3: 'Pienso en tu Mirá' (I'm thinking about your look).

Music video
The music video, directed by Diana Kunst and Mau Morgó, was released on 22 January 2019. It was shot in Campo de Criptana, Spain. In 2019, the music video won the UK Video Music Awards as the Best pop music video international.

The video content relates to the song contents by showing Rosalia on a motorbike, continuously sinking deeper in oil, which can be seen as a metaphor for the toxic relationship the lyrics describe, and to the title refers: 'de aqui no sales' translates into: 'you don't leave from here'.

Charts

References

2019 singles
2019 songs
Music videos shot in Spain
Rosalía songs
Song recordings produced by el Guincho
Songs written by Rosalía
Songs written by el Guincho